Palm Island is a neighborhood in the city of Miami Beach on a man-made island in Biscayne Bay, Florida, United States; just south of Hibiscus Island. It is a residential neighborhood with high property values, solely accessible by land via the MacArthur Causeway.

Education
Palm Island is zoned to schools in the Miami-Dade County Public Schools.

Zoned schools include:
 South Pointe Elementary School
 Nautilus Middle School
 Miami Beach High School

Notable people 
 Gabrielle Anwar
 Al Capone
 Sam Coslow
 Ana Gabriel
 Rajat Gupta
 Nick Nolte
 Scott Storch
 Barbara Walters
 Bryan "Birdman" Williams

Gallery

References

 Florida Atlas & Gazetteer (Third ed.) (1989). Freeport, ME: DeLorme Mapping.

External links 
 Location of Palm Island

Artificial islands of Florida
Islands of Miami Beach, Florida
Islands of Florida